Đặng Thái Sơn  (born July 2, 1958, in Hanoi, Vietnam) is a Vietnamese-Canadian classical pianist. In 1980, he won the X International Chopin Piano Competition in Warsaw, becoming the first pianist from Asia to do so. He has received particular acclaim for the sonority and poetry in his interpretations of Chopin and the French repertoire.

Career
Dang began studying the piano in Hanoi with his mother, Madame Thai Thi Lien, then a professor at the Vietnam National Academy of Music. He was discovered by a Russian pianist, Isaac Katz, on a visit to Vietnam in 1974. He studied at the Moscow Conservatory in Russia. In Moscow, he studied with Vladimir Natanson, a pupil of Samuil Feinberg, and subsequently with Dmitri Bashkirov.

In 1980, he won the X International Chopin Piano Competition in Warsaw, becoming the first pianist from Asia to do so.

In the 1980s, because of his Vietnamese citizenship, he could not move freely between countries to perform: he needed approval from the Vietnamese government before attending any concert, while each visa application would take 2 months. Dang said he "lost opportunities to make a career because of these political difficulties". However, since then, Dang has performed in more than 40 countries and on concert stages such as Lincoln Center (New York), Barbican Center (London), Salle Pleyel (Paris), Herculessaal (Munich), Musikverein (Vienna), Concertgebouw (Amsterdam), Sydney Opera House, Suntory Hall (Tokyo).

He has played with many renowned orchestras, including:

 Czech Republic:
 Czech Philharmonic Orchestra
 Prague Symphony
France:
 Orchestre de chambre de Paris
 Orchestre de Paris
Germany:
 Dresden Philharmonic
 Staatskapelle Berlin
Japan:
 New Japan Philharmonic
 NHK Symphony
Poland:
 Sinfonia Varsovia
 Warsaw National Philharmonic Orchestra
Russia:
 Moscow Philharmonic
 Moscow Virtuosi
 Russian National Orchestra
 St Petersburg Philharmonic
United Kingdom:
BBC Philharmonic
 City of Birmingham Symphony Orchestra
Philharmonia Orchestra
Other countries:
 Helsinki Philharmonic
 Hungarian State Symphony
 Orchestre Symphonique de Montreal
 Oslo Philharmonic
 Sydney Symphony
 Vienna Chamber Orchestra
 Zurich Chamber Orchestra

Dang has appeared under the direction of Sir Neville Marriner, Vladimir Ashkenazy, Pinchas Zukerman, Mariss Jansons, Paavo Järvi, Ivan Fischer, Frans Bruggen, Vladimir Spivakov, Dimitri Kitaenko and Sakari Oramo among others.

In the field of chamber music, he has performed with the Berlin Philharmonic Octet, the Smetana String Quartet, Barry Tuckwell, Tsuyoshi Tsutsumi, Pinchas Zukerman, Boris Belkin, Joseph Suk, Alexander Rudin, and he has played duo-piano with Andrei Gavrilov.

Other career highlights include a New Year's Day concert (1995) with Yo Yo Ma, Seiji Ozawa, Kathleen Battle, and the late Mstislav Rostropovich, in a major international event produced by the Japanese Broadcasting Corporation NHK; in January 1999, a Gala-concert opening the Chopin year, where he was the only foreign artist invited to appear as soloist with the Warsaw National Opera Theatre Orchestra; concerts in Isaac Stern's last festival in Miyazaki, Japan in 2001, which included three performances with Pinchas Zukerman; a special performance in 2005 as the only guest artist at the Opening Gala Concert of the XV International Chopin Piano Competition in Warsaw, where he was also a member of the jury; and on Chopin's 200th Birthday, March 1, 2010, he played at the Gala Concert the Concerto in f-minor with the Orchestra of the Eighteenth Century under the direction of Frans Bruggen at the Warsaw National Opera Theatre.

Dang Thai Son is frequently invited to give master classes around the world - such as the special class in Berlin in October, 1999, where he taught alongside Murray Perahia and Vladimir Ashkenazy. He has sat on the juries of prestigious competitions such as the Warsaw International Chopin Piano Competition (2005, 2010, 2015), Cleveland (USA), Clara Haskil (Switzerland), Artur Rubinstein (Tel-Aviv), Hamamatsu, Sendai (Japan), Piano Masters of Monte Carlo, Sviatoslav Richter (Moscow), Prague Spring International, Montreal International Piano Competition, and Ferruccio Busoni International Piano Competition among others.

During the 2012–2013 season, Dang Thai Son toured around the world with an ambitious program of all five Beethoven's piano concertos, the Beethoven Marathon. This colossal project was considered the most significant since his winning at the International Chopin Piano Competition in Warsaw in 1980.

He was a visiting professor at the Kunitachi College of Music, and a professor at the Universite de Montreal for 20 years. Dang joined the piano faculty at the Oberlin Conservatory of Music in 2018 and then the New England Conservatory in the Fall of 2020. He was named as Specially appointed Professor of Beijing Advanced Innovation Center for Chinese National School of Music and China Conservatory of Music. In June 2019, he was invited to be the honorary Professor at the Central Conservatory of Music in Beijing, China as well as visiting professor at the Taiwan National Normal University.

Dang is the winner of the Prix Opus in the 2016 "Concert of the Year" category for his concert presented by the Fondation Arte Musica at the Musee de Beaux Arts' Bourgie Hall in Montreal, Canada.

In September 2018, Ministry of Culture of Poland awarded Dang the gold Medal for Merit to Culture – Gloria Artis, the highest level of distinction awarded to distinguished contributions to Polish culture and national heritage.

Dang Thai Son received the "Doctor Honoris Causa" from the Bydgoszcz Music Academy - "Feliks Nowowiejski", Poland.

In 2021, Bruce Xiaoyu Liu, his student at the Université de Montréal won the XVIII International Chopin Piano Competition

Discography
Dang Thai Son has recorded for Deutsche Grammophon, Melodiya, Polskie Nagrania Muza, CBS Sony, Analekta, Victor JVC, and the Fryderyk Chopin Institute.

Mr. Dang's album "Chopin's Concertos" on Fryderyk Chopin Institute label was awarded in 2013 a Platinum Disc by the Polish Association of Audio-Video Producers for sales of over 10,000 copies. This disc features recordings of the Chopin Piano Concertos on a 1849 Erard piano and period instruments under the baton of the late Frans Bruggen and his Orchestra of the Eighteenth Century, documenting two memorable events in the festival "Chopin and his Europe" in 2005 and 2006.

Two exciting recording projects were released in 2017. The first one is a Schubert recording with Victor Kenwood Japan, a company that Dang Thai Son has worked with since 1995. The second recording devotes to Paderewski's compositions which includes the Piano Concerto in a minor and a selection of Paderewski's solo works. The Piano Concerto on this CD was recorded live with the Philharmonia Orchestra under the baton of Vladimir Ashkenazy during the "Chopin and his Europe" Festival in Warsaw on August 29, 2015. This recording was selected as "La clef du mois" (Disc of the Month) by ResMusica (Paris, France.)

Dang Thai Son was chosen by Deutsche Grammophone, in partnership with The Frederyk Chopin Institute, to be featured as one of the artists in their recently released 2-volume recording of music of Chopin on period instruments.

References

External links

 

1958 births
Living people
People from Hanoi
Vietnamese emigrants to Canada
Dang, Thai Son
Vietnamese classical pianists
Deutsche Grammophon artists
Canadian classical pianists
21st-century classical pianists
Moscow Conservatory alumni
Vietnamese expatriates in the Soviet Union